Slavko Cicak (born 25 October 1969) is a Swedish chess player. He was awarded the title Grandmaster by FIDE in 2001.

He played for Sweden in the Chess Olympiad in 2006, 2008 and 2010 and in the European Team Chess Championship in 2007. In 2005 he tied for 6th–9th with Normunds Miezis, Joel Benjamin and Alexander Baburin in the European Union Championship. In 2006 he tied for 2nd–5th with Leonid Gofshtein, José González García and Josep Manuel Lopez Martinez in the 8th Sants Open. In 2012, he shared first place with Hans Tikkanen and Emanuel Berg at the Västerås Open.

References

External links
Slavko Cicak chess games at 365Chess.com

1969 births
Living people
Chess grandmasters
Montenegrin chess players
Swedish chess players
Chess Olympiad competitors